Lao Mong Hay is a Cambodian political analyst. He was the winner of the 2000 Nansen Refugee Award.

Personal life 
Mong Hay was a refugee in the United Kingdom.

Career 
Mong Hay is a Political analyst, a professor of political sciences at the University of Toronto, and the executive director of the Khmer Institute of Democracy in Phnom Penh. In 2019, he was criticised by Cambodian Prime Minister Hun Sen, for what Sen saw as a tendency for negative perspectives.

From 1993 to 1994, Mong Hay led the Cambodian Mine Action Center from 1993-94. From 1988 until 1992, he was the Director of the Institute of Public Administration, the Head of the Human Rights Unit at the Khmer People's National Liberation Front and an aide to the KPLNF's leadership.

Mong Hay was the winner of the 2000 Nansen Refugee Award

References

External links 

 2009 interview in the The Phnom Penh Post

Year of birth missing (living people)
Living people
Cambodian human rights activists
Cambodian political people
Cambodian refugees
Khmer people
Nansen Refugee Award laureates